Starokostiantyniv (or Konstantynów;  Alt Konstantin) is a city in Khmelnytskyi Raion, Khmelnytskyi Oblast (province) of western Ukraine. It hosts the administration of Starokostiantyniv urban hromada, one of the hromadas of Ukraine. Population:

History

Starokostiantyniv was founded in the 16th century when Konstanty Ostrogski built a fortress at the village of Kolishchentsi. The surviving Starokostiantyniv Castle was constructed by his son between 1561 and 1571. The village grew into a town which became known as "Old Constantine's Town" (Kostiantyniv Staryi) to prevent confusion with "New Constantine's Town" in the vicinity. It became a private town of Poland, owned by the Ostrogski family. It was part of Polish Volhynian Voivodeship. 1648 saw the Battle of Starokostiantyniv.

In 1939, 6,743 Jews were living in the city, accounting for 31 percent of the total population. The Jewish community was murdered in mass executions perpetrated from August 1941 until November 1942.

Until 18 July 2020, Starokostiantyniv was incorporated as a city of oblast significance and served as the administrative center of Starokostiantyniv Raion though it did not belong to the raion. In July 2020, as part of the administrative reform of Ukraine, which reduced the number of raions of Khmelnytskyi Oblast to three, the city of Starokostiantyniv was merged into Khmelnytskyi Raion.

Notable residents
Abraham Goldfaden, poet and playwright, considered father of the modern Jewish theatre
Ben-Zion (1897–1987), painter; born in Starokostyantyniv.
Jakub Weinles, Polish painter
Anatoliy Bondarchuk, hammer thrower who won the gold medal at the 1972 Summer Olympics
Blank family - Lenin's ancestors
Chana Orloff (12 July 1888 – 16 December 1968), was an art deco and figurative art sculptor

Gallery

References

External links
 Weather in Starokostiantyniv.
 The murder of the Jews of Starokostiantyniv during World War II, at Yad Vashem website.

Cities in Khmelnytskyi Oblast
Volhynian Voivodeship (1569–1795)
Starokonstantinovsky Uyezd
Shtetls
Cities of regional significance in Ukraine
Holocaust locations in Ukraine